Trichodesma sordida is a species of death-watch beetle in the family Ptinidae. It is found in North America.

References

Further reading

 
 

Anobiinae
Articles created by Qbugbot
Beetles described in 1894